Spilosoma feifensis is a moth in the  family Erebidae. It was described by Wiltshire in 1986. It is found in Saudi Arabia.

References

Natural History Museum Lepidoptera generic names catalog

Moths described in 1986
feifensis